trans,cis-2,6-Nonadienal is an organic compound that is classified as a doubly unsaturated derivative of nonanal.  The molecule consists of a α,β-unsaturated aldehyde with an isolated alkene group.  The compound has attracted attention as the essence of cucumbers, but it is also found in bread crust and freshly cut watermelon.

Biosynthesis
Isotopic labeling has indicated that nonadienal is formed from α-linolenic acid.  Such reactions are typically catalyzed by hydroperoxide lyases.

See also
 2-Nonenal - another potent odorant in cucumber

References

Fatty aldehydes
Flavors